Hugh Dickson may refer to:

 Hughie Dickson (1895–1965), English footballer
 Hugh Dickson (footballer, born 1899), Scottish amateur footballer
 Hugh Dickson (footballer, born 1981), Northern Irish footballer
 Hugh Dickson (actor) (1927–2018), English actor who appeared in the 1981 radio series The Lord of the Rings